The 2022 European Individual Chess Championship was held from 27 March to 6 April 2022 in Brežice, Slovenia. In open competition, Matthias Blübaum and Gabriel Sargissian tied for first, with Blübaum securing the gold and Sargissian the silver via tie-breaking criteria. Multiple players tied for third place, with Ivan Šarić receiving the bronze via tie-breaking criteria. In the women's competition, medalists were Govhar Beydullayeva, Nurgyul Salimova, and Nataliya Buksa for gold, silver, and bronze, respectively. Zdenko Kožul won gold among senior players.

Results
The top eight finishers after all 11 rounds of the open competition were:

 Cheparinov competed under the flag of the European Chess Union.

References

European Individual Chess Championship
Chess in Slovenia
European Individual Chess Championship
Supranational chess championships
European Chess Championship
European Chess Championship
Brežice